Ouled Said is a town in central Algeria.

Communes of Adrar Province
Cities in Algeria
Algeria